Halderman–Van Buskirk Farmstead is a historic farm and national historic district located in Paw Paw Township, Wabash County, Indiana. It encompasses five contributing buildings, one contributing site, and four contributing structure on a farm established in 1860.  The farmhouse was built between 1860 and 1865, and is a -story, Gothic Revival style brick dwelling on a fieldstone foundation.  Other contributing resources are the milk house (c. 1920), carriage house (c. 1920), dairy barn (c. 1870), livestock barn (c. 1865), corn crib (c. 1865), grain bin (c. 1930), cistern (c. 1875), and grain silo (1941).

It was listed on the National Register of Historic Places in 2013.

References

Historic districts on the National Register of Historic Places in Indiana
Farms on the National Register of Historic Places in Indiana
Gothic Revival architecture in Indiana
Houses completed in 1865
1860 establishments in Indiana
Historic districts in Wabash County, Indiana
National Register of Historic Places in Wabash County, Indiana